The UL Bend Wilderness comprises 20,819 acres (84 km2) and is located in the U.S. state of Montana within the UL Bend National Wildlife Refuge, which in turn is also surrounded by the Charles M. Russell National Wildlife Refuge. Bordering on the Fort Peck Reservoir, a portion of the Missouri River that has been dammed. There are no maintained trails and the only access is either on foot or horseback. The Upper Missouri Breaks National Monument is located immediately west of the wilderness. The Lewis and Clark Expedition passed through this region and wrote extensively on the abundance of wildlife and the ruggedness of the countryside.

U.S. Wilderness Areas do not allow motorized or mechanized vehicles, including bicycles. Although camping and fishing are allowed with proper permit, no roads or buildings are constructed and there is also no logging or mining, in compliance with the 1964 Wilderness Act. Wilderness areas within National Forests and Bureau of Land Management areas also allow hunting in season. Hunting is permitted in this wilderness.

Broken into three sections, the largest portion is characterized by steep sided cliffs of the Missouri River "Breaks" country. Along the riverbanks, cottonwood trees flourish and are home to a wide diversity of wildlife. Mammals such as elk, bighorn sheep, pronghorn, bobcats and badgers thrive here and numerous waterfowl such as pelicans, Canada geese and herons are also common.

In the 1990s, UL Bend Wilderness was one of several sites selected for reintroduction of a small number of black-footed ferrets, the most endangered mammal in North America. The carnivorous black-footed ferret is heavily dependent on a plentiful supply of prairie dogs as this constitutes the bulk of their food intake.

References

External links
UL Bend Wilderness - Wilderness Connect
 
 

Protected areas of Phillips County, Montana
Wilderness areas of Montana
Protected areas established in 1976
1976 establishments in Montana